The Presbyterian Church in Korea (SunGyo) is a small Presbyterian denomination in South Korea with about 1,000 members and 10 congregations and 56 ordained pastors. It subscribes to the Apostles Creed and Westminster Confession.

References 

Presbyterian denominations in South Korea
Presbyterian denominations in Asia